Hengshi is a rural town in Ningxiang City, Hunan Province, China.

Administrative division
, the town administers 11 villages and one residential community: 
 Hengshi Community
 Wangbeifeng
 Yunshan
 Xiangyang
 Quanliu
 Hejin
 Limin
 Tiechong
 Jietou
 Jinfeng
 Guansheng 
 Renqiao.

Geography
The Wei River, known as "Mother River" and a tributary of the Xiang River, flows through the town.

Tiechong Reservoir is the largest reservoir and largest water body in the town.

Economy
The region abounds with iron.

Tobacco and watermelon are important to the economy.

Culture
Huaguxi is the most influence local theater.

Transportation

Provincial Highway 
The Provincial Highway S209 from Yutan Subdistrict, runs through Shuangfupu Town, Hengshi Town, Laoliangcang Town, Liushahe Town, Qingshanqiao Town to Loudi City.

Expressway 
The S71 Yiyang-Loudi-Hengyang Expressway, which connects Yiyang, Loudi and Hengyang, runs south through Laoliangcang Town, Liushahe Town and Hutian Town to its southern terminus at the junction of Changsha-Shaoshan-Loudi Expressway, and the north through Yujia'ao Township and Huishangang Town to Heshan District of Yiyang.

Railway 
The Luoyang–Zhanjiang Railway, from Luoyang City, Henan Province to Zhanjiang City, Guangdong Province, runs through Hengshi Town at Hengshi Railway Station.

References

External links
 

Divisions of Ningxiang
Ningxiang